Riverview Estates is a village in Cass County, Missouri, United States. The population was 82 at the 2010 census. It is part of the Kansas City metropolitan area.

Geography
The West Fork of East Creek flows through the eastern part of the village.

Demographics

Education
Belton School District is the local school district. Its comprehensive high school is Belton High School.

References

Villages in Cass County, Missouri
Villages in Missouri